Parliamentary elections were held in Poland on 23 March 1980. The results, like with the other elections in communist Poland, were controlled by the communist government. The results of the 1980 election exactly duplicated the 1976 elections, which were only marginally different from those of the preceding years.

Results

As the other parties and "independents" were subordinate to PZPR, its control of the Sejm was total.

References

Legislative
Parliamentary elections in Poland
Poland
Legislative
Poland
Elections in the Polish People's Republic